Rear Admiral Mark Anderson,  is a former Royal Navy officer who served as Commander Operations and Rear Admiral, Submarines.

Naval career
Educated at the University of Manchester, Anderson joined the Royal Navy in 1974 and was appointed commanding officer of the submarine  in 1993. He became Military Assistant to the Chief of Defence Logistics in May 2000, Commanding Officer of the frigate  in August 2002 and Director Equipment Capability (Underwater Effects) in March 2003 before moving on to become the Chief of the Defence Staff's Liaison Officer to the United States Joint Chiefs of Staff Committee in July 2007, and Commander Operations and Rear Admiral, Submarines in January 2009. He retired from the Royal Navy in March 2011.

In retirement Anderson became Strategy Director of Sonar & Undersea Systems and then Group Marketing Director at Ultra Electronics.

References

Royal Navy rear admirals
Companions of the Order of the Bath
Alumni of the University of Manchester
Year of birth missing (living people)
Place of birth missing (living people)
Living people